The Bolero was a concept car showcased by Buick in 1990. It was displayed at the Detroit Auto Show in January 1990 and the Chicago Auto Show in February 1990. It formed some of the basis for the 1992 Buick Skylark.

The Bolero possesses a 3.3 liter V6 engine. The rear deck was slightly higher than the hood, making for a more aerodynamic design. Fiber optics were utilized throughout the car. A built-in cooler was also included in the rear shelf, dual cup holders for the front and rear passengers, and portable headsets behind the front seats.

Its engine produces 206 horsepower at 5200 RPM.

References

External links
TriShield

Bolero